Edith Cochrane (born 8 September 1935) is an Australian sprint canoeist who competed in the late 1950s. She finished fifth in the K-1 500 m event at the 1956 Summer Olympics in Melbourne.

References

Edith Cochrane's profile at Sports Reference.com

1935 births
Australian female canoeists
Canoeists at the 1956 Summer Olympics
Living people
Olympic canoeists of Australia